Oona Grimes (born 1957) is a British artist and lecturer.

Biography
Grimes was born in London and attended the Norwich School of Art from 1982 to 1986 and the Slade School of Fine Art between 1986 and 1988. She lives in Hackney, London. Grimes has been a visiting lecturer at the Slade, the Ruskin School of Fine Art in Oxford and at the University of the Arts.

Artwork and exhibitions
Grimes draws, etches, paints and has made animations and films.

In 2018 Grimes was the recipient of a Bridget Riley fellowship.

Her themes have included Sigmund Freud and John Dee. She has worked with Iain Sinclair.

Exhibitions have included Uncanny Tales (2005), Hail the new Etruscan #2 (2018) and A Way of Seeing (2020).

Works by Grimes are held in the New Hall Art Collection, the British Museum and the New York Public Library.

Bibliography
 Uncanny Tales (2005, catalogue)

References

External links
 March Mostra 2018 / Meet the artists…Oona Grimes (blog of the British School at Rome)
 June Mostra 2018 / Meet the artists…Oona Grimes (blog of the British School at Rome)

1957 births
Living people
21st-century British painters
21st-century British women artists
20th-century British painters
Artists from London
People from Hackney, London
Alumni of Norwich University of the Arts
Alumni of the Slade School of Fine Art